Sir Robert Pigot, 2nd Baronet (1720–1796) was a British Army officer.

Robert Pigot may also refer to:

Robert Pigott (radical) (1736–1794), English food and dress reformer, a radical in politics and manners
Sir Robert Pigot, 4th Baronet (1801–1891), British politician, MP for Bridgnorth
Sir Robert Pigot, 6th Baronet (1882–1977), British Army and later Royal Air Force officer
Sir Robert Pigot, 7th Baronet (1915–1986), British soldier